WRSN/88.1 is an FM radio station licensed to Lebanon, Tennessee. It airs a Catholic religious format. It was assigned the WRSN callsign on November 20, 2008.

Repeater
 89.9

References

External links

RSN
Catholic radio stations
Catholic Church in Tennessee
Lebanon, Tennessee
2008 establishments in Tennessee
Radio stations established in 2008